The Destiny Map is an adventure published by West End Games (WEG) in 1990 for the cross-genre role-playing game Torg.

Description
The Storm Knights (player characters) in the United States (now a part of the primitive pseudo-reality of Baruk Kaah) discover a fragment of an ancient map that may lead to weapons the Storm Knights can use against the invading aliens. The Storm Knights must follow clues across the world to uncover more fragments of the map before their enemies can.

The original WEG publication also included a gamemaster's screen.

Publication history
WEG published the Torg role-playing game in 1990, and quickly followed up with a series of supplements and adventures, including The Destiny Map, a 64-page book written by  Christopher Kubasik, with interior art by Thomas Baxa, and cover art by David Dorman. A cardstock gamemaster's screen was also included.

The Destiny Map was the first part of the Relics of Power trilogy, and was followed by The Possibility Chalice and The Forever City, both also published in 1990. 

The entire Relics of Power trilogy was revised for Torg Eternity and published as Relics of Power Redux by Ulisses Spiele in 2020.

Reception
In the July 1990 edition of Games International (Issue 16), Paul Mason commended the "non-stop action", and called the adventure "detailed and tightly plotted." But he noted the pulp magazine tone of the adventure and warned players, "Whether you'll enjoy it depends on how you feel about the pulpishness of the background." 

Other reviewsWhite Wolf #24 (Dec./Jan., 1990)Games Review'' Vol. 2, Issue 10 (July 1990, p.48)

References

Role-playing game adventures
Role-playing game supplements introduced in 1990
Torg